1988 Football Championship of Ukrainian SSR was the 58th season of association football competition of the Ukrainian SSR, which was part of the Soviet Second League.

The 1988 Football Championship of Ukrainian SSR was won for the second time by FC Bukovyna Chernivtsi. Unlike the last season Tavriya, Bukovyna failed to earn promotion to the First League as it lost the inter-zonal playoffs.

Teams

Map

Promoted teams
Dnipro Cherkasy – Champion of the Fitness clubs competitions (KFK) (returning to professional level after an absence of 4 seasons)

Relegated teams 
 None

Relocated teams 
Prior to the start of the season Dynamo Bila Tserkva moved from Irpin to Bila Tserkva.

League standings

Top goalscorers

The following were the top ten goalscorers.

See also
 Soviet Second League

External links
 1988 Soviet Second League, Zone 6 (Ukrainian SSR football championship). Luhansk football portal

1988
3
Soviet
Soviet
football
Football Championship of the Ukrainian SSR